USCGC Reef Shark is the 69th  coastal patrol boat to be built. Her home port is Juneau, Alaska, where she is moored in Auke Bay.

Construction and characteristics
Her stern encloses a ramp which allows her to launch her cutter boat in more difficult sea conditions and with fewer people than conventional deck crane systems. The RIB is propelled by a Diesel engine, which allows her to be refueled from Reef Sharks tanks.

Reef Shark is powered by two eight-cylinder MTU diesel engines, each of which delivers . These, in turn, drive two five-bladed fixed-pitch propellers. Her unrefueled range is 900 miles and her at-sea endurance is three days.

She can carry a crew of eleven, and her staterooms accommodate any gender mix of sailors.

Reef Shark was commissioned at a ceremony at San Juan, Puerto Rico on 23 March 2009.  Delegate to Congress, Donna M. Christensen, sponsored the vessel and gave the keynote speech at the ceremony.

Service history 
Reef Shark was initially assigned to Coast Guard Base San Juan, Puerto Rico. One of Reef Sharks primary missions in San Juan was drug interdiction in the Caribbean. In April 2009, on one of her first missions after her commissioning, she intercepted a sailboat off the Virgin Islands which had  of cocaine on board in a hidden compartment. In March 2014 she seized  of cocaine worth $5.7 million. She also took part in numerous search and rescue missions in the waters around Puerto Rico and the U.S. Virgin Islands. The ship was also responsible for repatriating migrants seeking to reach the United States by sea.

She was reassigned to Boston.  On 21 February 2018, Reef Shark took the tug Captain Mackintire under tow near Portsmouth, New Hampshire.  The 74-year old vessel had collided with the tug that had been towing it and was in sinking condition.  By early the nest morning the crew cut the tow line and Captain Mackintire sank.

In March 2021, based once again in San Juan, Reef Shark participated in the seizure of $6.6 million of cocaine on a small boat transiting Mona Passage.

Reef Shark also aided in the management of sea-going migrants in the Caribbean.  In June 2020, she took 13 migrants off a makeshift boat near Puerto Rico.

On 8 April 2022 Reef Sharks home port was officially changed from San Juan to Juneau.  She replaced  there.  She transited the Panama Canal on her way to Alaska on 5 May 2022 and reached her new moorage in Auke Bay on 4 June 2022.

References

Ships of the United States Coast Guard
Patrol vessels of the United States
Marine Protector-class coastal patrol boats
Ships built in Lockport, Louisiana
2008 ships